A herder is a pastoral worker responsible for the care and management of a herd or flock of domestic animals, usually on open pasture. It is particularly associated with nomadic or transhumant management of stock, or with common land grazing. The work is often done either on foot or mounted.

Depending on the type of animal being herd, the English language can give different professional names, for example, cowboy for cows, shepherd for sheep, or goatherd for goat.

Terminology 

Herders may be distinguished by sex (e.g., herdsman, herdswoman or herdboy) or by the type of livestock, for example camelherd, cowherd, duckherd, goatherd or shepherd.

By country

China

Tibetan herding communities living in the Tibetan Plateau in the Sichuan Province of southwest China continued to graze herds on common lands even after the 1982 Household responsibility system. Several reasons have been given for the endurance of the traditional pastoral lifestyle:

complex topography prevents the division of common grazing lands among individual households
yaks require free grazing and become ill in fenced pasture
rotation of grazing spots

Grassland degradation has been an issue. Herding communities and their leaders have taken steps to reach a consensus about sustainable grazing practices. These include developing the community political organization to enforce commitments to seasonal rotational grazing.

By cattle type

Cows 

Goats

Sheep

See also

 Fulani herdsmen

References

Animal husbandry occupations